"She" is a song written by Charles Aznavour and Herbert Kretzmer and released by Aznavour as a single in 1974. The song was written in English as a theme tune for the British TV series Seven Faces of Woman.

Aznavour also recorded it in French, German, Italian and Spanish, under the titles "Tous les visages de l'amour" (English: All the Faces of Love), "Sie" (English: She) "Lei" (English: She) and "Es" (English: [She] is), respectively. He also recorded the song in a more uptempo French version with different lyrics, simply titled "Elle" (English: She).

The song peaked at number 1 on the UK Singles Chart and stayed there for four weeks; it was certified silver for shipments exceeding 300,000 units. It also reached number 1 in the Irish Charts, spending one week at the top. It was less popular outside the UK (where Seven Faces of Woman did not air); in France, the song narrowly missed the top 40, and in the United States, it failed to chart on the Billboard Hot 100 and charted on the lower end of the easy listening charts.

Elvis Costello recorded a cover version of the song in 1999. This version, produced by Trevor Jones, was featured over the opening credits and the final sequence of the film Notting Hill, and charted throughout Europe.

Track listing
"She" – 7" 45 rpm record
 "She" – 2:50
 "La barraka" – 2:45

"Lei" – 7" 45 rpm record
 "Lei"
 "La barraka"

"She" (1999 re-release) – CD single
 "She (Tous les visages de l'amour)" – 2:52
 "I Didn't See the Time Go By (Je n'ai pas vu le temps passer)" – 3:31

Charts and certifications

Weekly charts

Certifications

Elvis Costello version

Elvis Costello recorded a cover version of the song in 1999 for the soundtrack of the film Notting Hill. This version of the song peaked at number 19 in the United Kingdom, giving Costello his first top 20 hit in the United Kingdom in 16 years.

Track listing
2-track CD single – Europe (1999)
 "She" – 3:10
 "Painted from Memory" – 4:12

3-track CD single – Europe (1999)
 "She" – 3:08
 "This House Is Empty Now" – 5:11
 "What's Her Name Today?" – 4:11

CD single – United Kingdom (1999)
 "She" – 3:08
 "Painted from Memory" – 4:14
 "The Sweetest Punch" – 4:09

Charts

Certifications

Laura Pausini cover

Italian singer Laura Pausini also released an Italian language cover of the song, titled "She (Uguale a lei)". The song was recorded for a Barilla TV spot. The lyrics of the song were adapted by Pausini herself, and are therefore different from the lyrics of Aznavour's Italian-language version of his hit. It was also released as a digital single on 8 March 2006, but was not featured on any of Pausini's studio albums. However, she recorded a new version of the song, included in her greatest hits album 20 - The Greatest Hits.

Live performances
Pausini performed the song live for the first time during the final of Sanremo Music Festival 2006, when she was invited as a guest artist. A live version of the song was included in a medley performed on 2 June 2007, during her concert at the San Siro stadium in Milan, later released as a video album titled San Siro 2007.

Track listing
Digital download
 "She (Uguale a lei)" – 2:59

Charts

Other cover versions
In addition to the famous Elvis Costello version noted above, the song has been recorded by many different artists over the years. The most notable versions include:
 American singer Jack Jones recorded a cover of the song for his 1975 album What I Did for Love. It was released as a single, becoming a big hit in the Philippines.
Péter Máté created a Hungarian cover of the song. The first record containing this was only released after his death.
British Comedian and music Hall legend Ken Dodd recorded a version for his 1976 album love together 
 Dave Stewart and Terry Hall's short-lived project Vegas had a minor UK hit with the song in 1992, peaking at number 43 on the UK Singles Chart. Aznavour starred in the music video, standing at a fountain while being secretly observed by Hall and Stewart.
 The British Pop singer Engelbert Humperdinck recorded the song on his 2003 CD Definition of Love. He included a duet of She with Charles Aznavour on his 2014 duets album Engelbert Calling.
 French singer Jason Kouchak recorded the song for his 2008 album Midnight Classics.
 Irish singing group Celtic Thunder made a coverversion on their second show Celtic Thunder: Act Two (2008) where Paul Byrom performed the song.
 A version by the composer and record producer Jason Hill, featuring Richard Butler of The Psychedelic Furs, was used in the trailer for David Fincher's movie, Gone Girl, in 2014.
Israeli singer Matti Caspi released a Hebrew cover of the song in 2005.
Paul Byrom recorded a cover of the song while a member of Celtic Thunder; the song was released on the self-titled debut album and their concert DVD "The Show."
Former E.L.O. frontman Jeff Lynne released a cover version of the song on his 2012 album Long Wave.
The duo She & Him released a cover of the song on their 2014 album, Classics.
Richard Butler recorded a cover of the song in 2014 for the Gone Girl trailer.
Daniel Boaventura recorded for Morde & Assopra (Dinosaurs & Robots) soundtrack and a performance on his live album, "Daniel Boaventura: Ao Vivo" in 2011.
Jay-R, the R&B prince, covered it for Philippine soap opera Beauty Queen.
CBBC used the song for a reflective montage at the end of the memorial retrospective My Sarah Jane, celebrating the long-running Whoniverse character Sarah Jane Smith following the death of actress Elisabeth Sladen.
Bryan Ferry covered it at the 2009 Cannes Film Festival with Aznavour joining him on stage at the end of the performance.
Leeteuk (이특) Korean singer and member of the group Super Junior sang it as his solo part in their concert Super Show 4 in 2011/2012 and is recorded on their live album released in July 2013

References

Charles Aznavour songs
Elvis Costello songs
Laura Pausini songs
1974 singles
1999 singles
2006 singles
Pop ballads
UK Singles Chart number-one singles
Irish Singles Chart number-one singles
Songs written by Charles Aznavour
Songs with lyrics by Herbert Kretzmer
1974 songs
Barclay (record label) singles
Island Records singles
Mercury Records singles
Warner Music Group singles
Songs written for films